"You Make Me Feel Like a Man" is a song written by Peter Rowan, and recorded by American country music artist Ricky Skaggs.  It was released in August 1985 as the first single from his album Live in London.  The song reached #7 on the Billboard Hot Country Singles chart in December 1985 and #8 on the RPM Country Tracks chart in Canada.

Chart performance

References

1985 singles
Ricky Skaggs songs
Epic Records singles
1985 songs
Songs written by Peter Rowan
Song recordings produced by Ricky Skaggs